Jay Saunders (né John Henry Saunders III; born 29 June 1944 Sacramento, California) is an American trumpeter and music educator at the collegiate level.  In the 1970s, Saunders was a lead trumpeter with big bands — notably the Stan Kenton Orchestra (early seventies) — and a session musician in the Dallas area.  Saunders recently retired from the faculty at the University of North Texas College of Music where he taught jazz trumpet, jazz recordings, and directed the One O'Clock Lab Band.

Education 
Originally from Sacramento, California, Saunders attended the University of North Texas College of Music from 1965 to 1968 where he studied trumpet with John Haynie (1924–2014).  Saunders was a member of the One O'Clock Lab Band, served as an undergraduate teaching assistant in trumpet, and played two short tours with the Stan Kenton Orchestra.  After earning a Bachelor of Music in 1968, Saunders played lead trumpet in the Studio Band(now called the "Jazz Ambassadors") of the United States Army Field Band in Washington, D.C., from 1968 to 1971.  Upon discharge from the U.S. Army, he immediately rejoined the Kenton Orchestra in July 1971, eventually playing lead trumpet until the fall of 1972.  That fall, Saunders returned to the UNT College of Music to work on his master's degree.  While there, he served as a graduate assistant teacher of trumpet and lab bands until the summer of 1975.  He earned a Master of Music Education in fall 1974.

His tenure with the Army Studio Band (1968–71) and Kenton (1971–72) coincided closely with that of Ray Brown — a composer, arranger, trumpet player, and jazz educator, who, while with the Kenton Orchestra, held the jazz trumpet chair.

Applied music 
Saunders played lead trumpet and toured with the Stan Kenton Orchestra and the Studio Band of the United States Army Field Band at Fort Meade, Maryland.  Saunders played off and on with the Kenton band for many years and taught at Kenton clinics.  He recorded eleven albums with Kenton and one album each with Ornette Coleman and Doc Severinsen as well as many religious, Latino and rock artists.

As a member of the Jerry Gray Orchestra at the Fairmont Hotel's Venetian Room, Saunders backed noted artists, including Sarah Vaughan, Billy Eckstine, Tony Bennett, and Ella Fitzgerald as well as hundreds of other well-established performers.  He has been an educator/performer in the Dallas–Fort Worth area since the 1980s, performing with the Fort Worth and Dallas Symphony Orchestras as part of their Pops Series, playing first trumpet for the Dallas Summer Musicals, as well as a variety of recordings and shows in the area.

Saunders has been heard playing lead trumpet on broadcasts for the BBC, VOA, WABC, KABC, WNBC, WCBS and for the CNN/SI, CNN, HBO, ESPN Radio, Warner Bros. and Paramount TV themes, in addition to many other broadcasters in the United States.  As an educator, Saunders has taught at Richland College, Tarrant County College, Texas Wesleyan University, Collin College, and the University of North Texas College of Music.

He also plays with Pete Petersen and The Collection Jazz Orchestra. "He has a reputation as being one of the best," said Petersen of Saunders. Petersen told the Fort Worth Star-Telegram that he had needed a trumpet player for the recording of Playing in the Park in the mid-1980s. Saunders continues to play with them. The band went on to record two other albums.

Selected discography 
As a trumpeter with the Stan Kenton Orchestra

 Live at Brigham Young University (1972); 
 The Four Freshmen:  Live at Butler University, with Stan Kenton and his Orchestra, Creative World Inc. (2 LPs, quadraphonic), 1972; re-released by GNP Crescendo Records (CDs) (1986); 
 Stan Kenton Today (recorded live, Fairfield Halls, Croydon, Surrey, UK, February 10, 1972, 2nd show), originally released in 1972 by Creative World Inc. (2 LPs, quadraphonic), re-released by Dutton Vocalion (2 CDs) (2005); 
Selections (Videos) from a Feb 6, 1972, live audience BBC recording (same band):
  by Hank Levy (1927–2001)
  by Willie Maiden (1928–1976)
  by Jimmy Webb (1946– ), arranged by Dee Barton (1937–2001)
  (El Manisero) — featuring the trumpet section, by Moises Simons (1889–1945), arranged by Pete Rugolo (1915–2011)
  by Ray Wetzel (1924–1951)
 Rhapsody in Blue (1972); 
 National Anthems Of The World, Creative World Inc. (2 LPs, quadraphonic) (1972); 
 7.5 on the Richter Scale (1973); 
 Street of Dreams (1991); 
 Live at Newport Jazz Festival (1999); 

 As a trumpeter with Pete Petersen & The Collection Jazz Orchestra

 Playin' in the Park (1989); 
 Straight Ahead (1990); 
 Night & Day (1996); 

With Doc Severinsen

 Night Journey, originally released 1976, re-released Nov 10, 2009, by Wounded Bird Records (CD); 

As director of the Two O'Clock Lab Band

 Too Two (2009) CD;
 Under The Radar (2010) CD; 
 , by Brett McDonald (saxophonists on the recording)
 , arranged by  Sean Nelson (lead trombonist on the recording)
 , arranged by Sean Nelson (lead trombonist on the recording)
 , by Thomas Davis (lead trumpeter on the recording)
 Two Twos (2011–12) 2 CDS
 Kind of Two (2013) CD

Family 
On January 27, 1968, Jay married Patricia Lynn Bode, who, in 1968, earned a Bachelor of Music from the University of North Texas College of Music.  Jay and Pat have a son, Stephen Kenton Saunders (born 1972).

References 
Inline citations

External links 
Jay Saunders' page on the North Texas Jazz website
Jay Saunders' page on the North Texas College of Music website
recordings that Jay Saunders is on

Musicians from Sacramento, California
University of North Texas College of Music alumni
University of North Texas College of Music faculty
Big band trumpet players
American jazz trumpeters
American male trumpeters
Living people
1944 births
21st-century trumpeters
Jazz musicians from California
Jazz musicians from Texas
21st-century American male musicians
American male jazz musicians